Binhai, officially known as Binhai New Area, is a sub-provincial district and state-level new area within the jurisdiction of Tianjin Municipality in the People's Republic of China.

Binhai is intended to replicate development seen in Shenzhen and Pudong in Shanghai.

Geography
Binhai is located on the west coast of the Bohai Sea and east of Tianjin's main urban area. It is a part of the Bohai Economic Rim.

Natural resources
Binhai New Area has  of water and wetlands and a further  of wasteland that is being re-developed into saline land. It has proven oil resources totalling more than 100 million tons, and 193.7 billion cubic meters (6.84 trillion cubic feet) of natural gas.

Administrative divisions
There are 19 subdistricts and 7 towns in the district:

 Defunct
 Now part of Tanggu: Yujiapu Subdistrict, Xingang Subdistrict, Xincun Subdistrict north
 Now part of Hangzhou Street: Xiangyang Subdistrict
 Now part of Dagu: Bohaishiyou Subdistrict, Xincun Subdistrict south
 Now part of Hangu: Datian town
 Now part of Chadian: Hexi Subdistrict
 Now part of Dagang: Yingbin Subdistrict, Shengli Subdistrict
 Now part of Haibin: Gangxi Subdistrict

History 
The Binhai district was created by the government of China in the 1990s. In 1996 Soviet aircraft carrier Kiev was sold to Binhai Aircraft Park, a theme park in Binhai. The concept was developed by world tourism and attraction consultant Leisure Quest International.

In August 2011, the ex-Kiev was developed into a luxury hotel after renovations costing £9.6 million.

Starting from November 2009, Binhai New Area was consolidated into a district, and the former subordinate districts of Tanggu, Hangu and Dagang were abolished. Binhai New Area consists of nine functional zones: Advanced Manufacturing Zone, Airport-based Industrial Zone, Binhai High-tech Industrial Development Zone, Seaport-based Industrial Zone, Nangang Industrial Zone, Seaport Logistics Zone, Coastal Leisure & Tourism Zone, Sino-Singapore Tianjin Eco-City and the Yujiapu Financial District. In addition, Tianjin Port whose throughput ranks 5th in the world is also located here.

The Binhai district was greatly affected by a large industrial-scale accident in August 2015. On August 12, a series of explosions took place at a port chemical storage facility in Binhai, causing 173 deaths and 797 injuries. The blast had the equivalent of 21 metric tons of TNT or a magnitude-2.9 earthquake, according to the China Earthquake Networks Center. Eight other people remain missing.

Economy
Yujiapu Financial District located in Binhai is an under construction financial district with a glitzy skyline envisioned to be a center of world trade and finance. Other parts of Binhai have also been intended to be a base for China's advanced industrial and financial reform and innovation. The Tianjin Economic-Technological Development Area (TEDA) is an early free trade zone.

Tianjin Emissions Exchange organized China's first sulfur dioxide, carbon neutral, contract energy management and energy efficiency product transactions, and established China's first voluntary emission reduction public inquiry system.

A number of major international companies including Rockefeller, Tishman Speyer, Motorola and Airbus have built branches here. For instance, EADS Airbus has already opened an assembly plant for its A320 series airliners, operational since 2009. Domestic companies headquartered in Binhai include noodlemaker Tingyi.

Culture

A large culture complex, Binhai Cultural Center, with five central attractions planned. The centerpiece of the complex is the library that opened in November 2017. The library is nicknamed 'The Eye' because the sphere, which appears like an iris, can be seen from the park outside through an eye-shaped opening.

The remnant of Taku Forts in the form of a gun platform overlooks the Hai River (Peiho River) in Binhai.

Education
Many colleges and universities in Tianjin have branch campuses in Binhai New Area. In 2003, Nankai University established the TEDA Campus in the Tianjin Economic and Technological Development Zone, which is dedicated to research on genomes, functional genomics, biochips, and molecular virology. Tianjin University of Science and Technology will move into Binhai New Area as a whole. The Juilliard College of New York and the Tianjin Conservatory of Music cooperated with the Juilliard Research Institute of the Tianjin Conservatory of Music in the Yujiapu Financial District to provide pre-university and postgraduate education. At the same time, Tianjin Maritime Vocational College, Tianjin Development Zone Vocational and Technical College, Tianjin Binhai Vocational College are located in Binhai New Area.

Transportation

Rail
High speed rail stops in Binhai with Binhai railway station and Tanggu railway station on the Beijing-Tianjin Intercity Railway. Binhai West railway station and Binhai North railway station are stops along the Tianjin–Qinhuangdao High-Speed Railway. Tanggu railway station is also a station on the conventional speed Tianjin–Shanhaiguan Railway.

Metro
Binhai is currently served by one metro line and one tram line operated by Tianjin Metro:

   - Hujiayuan, Tanggu, TEDA , Citizen Plaza, Convention and Exhibition Center Station, Donghai Road
   - TEDA , First Avenue, Second Avenue, Third Avenue, Fourth Avenue, Fifth Avenue, Sixth Avenue, Seventh Avenue, Ninth Avenue, Tenth Avenue, Eleventh Avenue, International Joint Academy, College District, North of College District

Road
There are 11 expressways (include 5 national expressways and 6 provincial expressways), 3 national highways and several provincial and county-level highways run through Binhai.
  runs through northeast coastline, west part and southeast coastline of Binhai.
  starts at Nangang Industrial Zone, on the south of Binhai.
  (formerly ) ends at Hebei Road, on the middle-west of Binhai.
  runs through west part of Binhai.
  starts at Dashentang, on the northeast of Binhai.
  ends at G103, near Hujiayuan station of line 9.
  ends at Dagang College Town.
  runs through middle coastline.
  starts at Ningchegu, on the north of Binhai.
  ends at Dongjiang Port Area, on the east of Binhai.
  starts at Lingang Industrial Zone, on the east of Binhai.
  ends at Gate IV of Tianjin Port.
  runs through Lutai, Hangu, Beitang, Xinjiayuan, Hujiayuan, Dengshangu, Guangang, Gangdong New Town, Dagang Oil Field and Mapengkou towns of eastern Tianjin.
  starts at Qingfang Economical Zone of Dagang.

References

External links
Binhai New Area Government official website
Official Tianjin Media Gateway 
Renaissance Tianjin TEDA Convention Centre Hotel

New areas (China)
2009 establishments in China
Districts of Tianjin
Economy of Tianjin
Special economic zones
Special Economic Zones of China